Glicério is a municipality in the state of São Paulo in Brazil. The population is 4,829 (2020 est.) in an area of 273 km2. The elevation is 400 m. The city is known for being the birthplace of former president of Brazil, Jair Bolsonaro.

The city was originally founded in 1906 as the village of Povoado de Castilho.  The name of the village originated from the presence of the Castilho family who set up the first ranches in the area.

Notable people
Jair Bolsonaro (born 1955) 38th President of Brazil and former Federal Deputy of Brazil and captain of the Brazilian Army.

References

 
1906 establishments in Brazil
Populated places established in 1906
Municipalities in São Paulo (state)
Jair Bolsonaro